Ling Ling Agustin Minangmojo (born 23 August 1969) is an Indonesian former table tennis player. She competed in the women's singles event at the 1992 Summer Olympics.

References

External links
 

1969 births
Living people
Indonesian female table tennis players
Olympic table tennis players of Indonesia
Table tennis players at the 1992 Summer Olympics